Mors or Morsø is an island in the shallow sound called Limfjorden within Denmark's Jutland peninsula. It has an area of 367.3 km² and as of 1 January 2019, it had a population of 20,373. The main town on the island is called Nykøbing Mors. Geologically Mors is unique. Like the neighbouring island of Fur, it is known for its deposits of diatomite, locally known as 'moler' (mo-clay).

Sights

Jesperhus Flower Park
The largest flower park in the Nordic countries, Jesperhus, is situated in Legind Bjerge to the south west of Nykøbing. The park contains wide range of plants, including cacti, palms, a variety of roses and a lot of other colourful flowers. The park also has a butterfly reserve, aquarium, aviary, terrarium and hatching center.

The Moler Museum

The Moler Museum boasts the largest collection of moler (diatomite) fossils in Denmark and tells the story of moler geology, the natural history of the island, and the relationship between the Danish people and moler including its manufacturing properties. The fossils include imprints of birds, fish, turtles, plants and insects.

Hanklit

Hanklit is situated on the northern coast of the island and is a beautiful cliff face and tourist attraction. The cliff is c. 60 metres high and has several moler deposits. Several people search the cliff face for plant and animal fossils and there are also paragliders who use the nearby hills of Salgerhøj for takeoff.

Shellfish

Mors is known for its shellfish industries; specifically mussel and oyster fisheries and aquaculture. The Danish Shellfish Center (Dansk Skaldyrcenter), part of the Technical University of Denmark, is a research and dissemination center for marine science and aquaculture. The Danish Shellfish Festival takes place in Nykøbing Mors every year in June, celebrating the shellfish industries and Limfjorden traditions.

Transportation 

There is a bridge link to the island from Salling via the Sallingsund Bridge on the southeastern side of Mors, and another from Thy via the Vilsund Bridge on the northwestern side of the island. In addition to these two bridges, there are also ferry links to Thy from southwest Mors and from the north of the island. There is also a small airfield called "Morsø" with ICAO EKNM.

History 

During the Jutland Peasant rebellion of 1441, Christopher of Bavaria, King of Denmark, approached the rebel camp at Husby Hole near St Jørgen's Hill in northern Jutland and sent word that anyone who left the camp and went home would not be punished for rebellion. The men from the island of Mors as well as those from Thisted left, for which they were afterwards called cowards and traitors.

Notable people 

 Peter Rochegune Munch (born 1870 in Redsted – 1948) was a leading historian and politician
 Aksel Sandemose (born 1899 in Nykøbing Mors) was a writer and journalist, famous for popularizing the Law of Jante 
Frode Jakobsen (born 1906 in Østre Jølby – 1997) a Danish author and politician
Knud Sørensen (born 1928) a writer, poet and novelist; settled on Mors a surveyor in 1958
 Arne Rolighed (born 1947 in Flade) a politician, who served as minister of health 2000–2001.
 Asbjørn Riis (born 1957 in V. Hvidbjerg) a professional wrestler, actor and TV personality.
 Inger Støjberg (born 1973 in Hjerk, Salling) politician, the Danish Minister for Immigration, Integration and Housing, 2015 to 2019

Attractions 

 Dueholm Monastery
 Højriis Castle
 Jesperhus Resort
 Moler Museum
 Danish Støberimuseum
 Danish Shellfish Center

See also

 List of Danish islands
Morsø municipality
Traditional districts of Denmark
Asbjørn Riis
Rakkeby

References

External links
Mors Tourist

Islands in the Limfjord
Morsø Municipality